"Golden Leaves" is a song by Italian actress and singer Noemi Smorra featuring Lena Katina, a former member of the early 2000s music band, t.A.T.u. This Europop song was written by Fernando Alba and Kathleen Haghen. Smorra and Katina first premiered Golden Leaves during a gig at the Auditorium Parco della Musica of Rome in November, 2014 and single was released two months later.

Music video
The concept video for the song was directed by Livia Alcalde and Francesco Sperandeo and shot in Rome: young Lena introduces young Noemi to the magic world in an old Circus, and then they meet years later as grown up fairies. Golden Leaves fantasy music video received enthusiastic reviews and won several international awards, being screened in TCL Chinese Theatre in Hollywood and in many other theaters in Europe and USA.

Charts and accolades
Golden Leaves was charted for 39 weeks and peaked #4 on the TOP20 in Russian state TV Channel One Russia, and ranked #16 in year-end video chart of 2015.

FilmQuest Festival (USA) - Nominations: Best Music Video, Best Costumes
Best Shorts Awards (USA) - Winner Award of Excellence Special Mention: Music Video
Global Music Awards (USA) - Bronze Medal Winner: Music Video
HollyShorts Film Festival (USA) - Official selection: Music Video
Thurrock International Film Festival (UK) - Official selection: Music Video
Digitalmation Awards (USA) - Winner: Music Video
Mizzica Film Festival (Italy) - Selezione Videoclip 2015
Avanca Film Festival (Portugal) - Trailer in Motion 2015 official selection: Music Video
Apex Short Film + Music Video Festival (USA) - Official selection: Music Video
Hamilton Music and Film Festival (Canada) - Official selection: Music Video
Visioni Corte Film Festival (Italy) - Finalista sez. Cortomusic
The Monthly Film Festival (USA) - Nomination: Music Video Of The Month
Utah Music Awards (USA) - Nomination: Music Video
European Film Festival (Germany) - Winner: Best Music Video
London Shows Film Festival (UK) - Winner: Best Music Video

References

External links
 
 

2015 singles
Lena Katina songs
2015 songs